The Qimant language is a highly endangered language spoken by a small and elderly fraction of the Qemant people in northern Ethiopia, mainly in the Chilga woreda in Semien Gondar Zone between Gondar and Metemma.

Classifications
The language belongs to the western branch of the Agaw or Central Cushitic languages. Other (extinct) members of this branch are Qwara and Kayla. Along with all other Cushitic languages, Qimant belongs to the Afro-Asiatic language family.

Geographic distribution and sociolinguistic situation
Qimant is the original language of the Qemant people of Semien Gondar Zone and Ethiopia. Although the ethnic population of the Qemant was 172,327 at the 1994 census, only a very small fraction of these speak the language nowadays. All speakers live either in Chilga woreda or in Lay Armachiho woreda. The number of first-language speakers is 1625, the number of second language speakers 3450. All speakers of the language are older than 30 years, and more than 75% are older than 50 years. The language is no longer passed on to the next generation of speakers. Most ethnic Qemant people speak Amharic. Qimant is not spoken in public or even at house as a means of day communication any more, but is reduced to a secret code.

Dialects/Varieties

It is not clear to what extent Kayla, Qwara and Qimant have been dialects of the same Western Agaw language, or were languages distinct from each other.

Phonology

Consonants

Continuants can be geminated word-medially.

Vowels

Phonotactics
The maximum syllable structure in Qimant is CVC, which implies that consonant clusters are only allowed word-medially. In loanwords from Amharic there may also be consonant-clusters within a syllable. Vowel clusters are not allowed.

Phonological processes
Consonant clusters with more than two consonants are broken up by inserting the epenthetic vowel .

Prosody
The prosodic features of Qimant have not been studied yet.

Grammar

Morphology
The personal marking system distinguishes between first person singular and plural, second person singular, polite, and plural, and third person masculine, feminine and plural. On the verb, all inflectional categories are marked by suffixes. Zelealem (2003, p. 192) identifies three different aspect forms in Qimant: Perfective, Imperfective and Progressive. Like in other Central Cushitic languages, the numbers one to nine go back to an ancient quinary system, where the suffix  added to the numbers two to four results in the numbers six to nine  (2-4 are three numbers, 6-9 are four numbers).

Syntax
The basic constituent order in Qimant, like in all other Afro-Asiatic languages of Ethiopia, is SOV. The presence of a case marking system allows for other, more marked orders. In the noun phrase the head noun follows its modifiers. Numbers, however, can also follow the head noun. All kind of subordinate clauses precede the main verb of the sentence.

Vocabulary
As a consequence of the looming language death, many items of the vocabulary are already replaced by Amharic words.

References

 Zelealem Leyew. 2003. The Kemantney Language – A Sociolinguistic and Grammatical Study of Language Replacement. Cologne: Rüdiger Köppe Verlag.
 David L. Appleyard.  1975.  "A descriptive outline of Kemant," Bulletin of the School of Oriental and African Studies 38:316-350.

Notes

External links
 Qimant phonology and grammar
 World Atlas of Language Structures information on Kemant

Central Cushitic languages
Languages of Ethiopia
Amhara Region
Endangered languages of Africa